Falguière is a station on line 12 of the Paris Métro in the 15th arrondissement.

The station opened on 5 November 1910 as part of the original section of the Nord-Sud Company's line A between Porte de Versailles and Notre-Dame-de-Lorette. On 27 March 1931 line A became line 12 of the Métro. It is named after the Rue Falguière.  Alexandre Falguière (1831–1890) was a French sculptor and painter.

The Necker-Enfants Malades Hospital (the first paediatric hospital in the world) is nearby.

Station layout

Gallery

References
 Roland, Gérard (2003). Stations de métro. D’Abbesses à Wagram. Éditions Bonneton.

Paris Métro stations in the 15th arrondissement of Paris
Railway stations in France opened in 1910